The climate in Quebec City has a continental climate with no dry season and a warm summer (meaning Dfb)

Temperature

The average temperature in Quebec City arranges from -27 °C (-16.6 °F) in January to 24.7 °C (76.46 °F) in July. The average annual mean temperature is 4.2 °C (39.5 °F). Every year there are 23 days of temperatures ≥35 °C (86 °F). There are 171 days with freezing temperatures.

Averages

Average monthly maxima and minima

Extremes

Precipitation

There are almost 900 mm of rain in Quebec City, The wettest month is July with 121.4 mm. While the driest is February of only 15.2. 1189.7 mm of total precipitation fall a year. Snowfall falls 303.4 cm/yr.

Total precipitation

References 

Quebec City
Climate by city in Canada